Zemst-Laar or Laar is a village in Flemish Brabant, Belgium. It is part of the municipality of Zemst.

Populated places in Flemish Brabant